These are the official results of the men's 110 metres hurdles event at the 1983 IAAF World Championships in Helsinki, Finland. There were a total number of 28 participating athletes, with four qualifying heats, two semi-finals and the final held on 12 August 1983.

Records
Existing records at the start of the event.

Results

Qualifying heats
The qualifying heats took place on 11 August, with the 28 athletes involved being splitted into 4 heats. The first 3 athletes in each heat ( Q ) and the next 4 fastest ( q ) qualified for the semifinals. 

Wind: Heat 1: +1.1 m/s, Heat 2: +1.9 m/s, Heat 3: +1.9 m/s, Heat 4: +2.1 m/s

Heat 1

Heat 2

Heat 3

Heat 4

Semifinals
The semifinals took place on 12 August, with the 16 athletes involved being splitted into 2 heats. The first 4 athletes in each heat ( Q ) qualified for the final. 

Wind:
Heat 1: +0.9 m/s, Heat 2: –0.7 m/s

Heat 1

Heat 2

Final
The final took place on August 12.

Wind: +1.3 m/s

References

H
Sprint hurdles at the World Athletics Championships